Cychrus grajus is a species of ground beetle in the subfamily of Carabinae. It was described by K. Daniel & J. Daniel in 1898.

References

grajus
Beetles described in 1898